The 2008 Malaysia Super Series is the inaugural tournament of the 2008 BWF Super Series in badminton. It was held in Kuala Lumpur, the capital of Malaysia, from 15 to 20 January 2008.

Absence
Several top players were absence from the tournament. Among them, Lin Dan of China and Boonsak Ponsana of Thailand. Peter Gade of Denmark will not defend his men's singles crown after stay at home for his ill family. While for Xie Xingfang, the Chinese women's singles player, she has to quit after reported to have falling down in the hotel bathroom.

Men's singles

Seeds

Results

Women's singles

Seeds

Results

Men's doubles

Seeds
 / Tan Boon Heong
 / Hendra Setiawan
 / Fu Haifeng
 / 
 / Lee Wan Wah
 / Lee Yong-dae
 / Martin Lundgaard Hansen
 / Hwang Ji-man

Results

Women's doubles

Seeds
 / Wei Yili
 / Zhang Jiewen
 / Lee Hyo-jung
 / Yu Yang
 / Cheng Wen-Hsing
 / Reiko Shiota
 / Donna Kellogg
 / Vita Marissa

Results

Mixed doubles

Seeds
 / Gao Ling
 / Lilyana Natsir
 / Zhang Yawen
 / Vita Marissa
 / Gail Emms
 / Yu Yang
 / Kamilla Rytter Juhl
 / Saralee Thungthongkam

Results

References

External links
Official website 
Tournamentsoftware.com: 2008 Malaysia Super Series

Malaysia Open (badminton)
Sport in Kuala Lumpur
2008 in Malaysian sport
Malaysia